Onchidium griseofuscum is regarded as a nomen dubium.

References

Onchidiidae
Gastropods described in 1874